Abisara geza, the Spotted Judy, is a butterfly in the family Riodinidae. It is found in Asia.

Subspecies
Abisara geza geza
Abisara geza litavicus Fruhstorfer, 1912 (northern Borneo)
Abisara geza niasana Fruhstorfer, 1904 (Nias)
Abisara geza niya Fruhstorfer, 1914 (Peninsular Malaya, Singapore, Riouw Islands)
Abisara geza erilda Fruhstorfer, 1914 (western and southern Java)
Abisara geza sura Bennett, 1950 (Sumatra)
Abisara geza latifasciata Inoue & Kawazoe, 1964

References

Butterflies described in 1904
Abisara
Butterflies of Singapore
Butterflies of Indochina